The 1975 England rugby union tour of Australia was a series of eight matches played by the England national rugby union team in Australia in May and June 1975. England won only four of the eight matches and lost both internationals to Australia. In addition to the two test defeats they also lost to the Sydney and New South Wales Country representative teams.

The England selectors boldly, and in the circumstances quite rightly, chose an experimental squad for this, England's first tour of Australia. That the experiment was not altogether successful, nor the tour the team building exercise it had been intended to be, was largely due to the extraordinary number of injuries suffered by the England squad, frequently to key players.

Matches
Scores and results list England's points tally first.

Touring party
 Manager: Alec Lewis
 Assistant Manager: John Burgess
 Captain: Tony Neary (Broughton Park) 26 caps

Backs

 Brian Ashton (Orrell) No caps
 Neil Bennett (Bedford) 1 cap
 Peter Butler (Gloucester) No caps
 Alastair Hignell (Cambridge University) No caps
 Peter Kingston (Gloucester) No caps
 Andy Maxwell (New Brighton) No caps
 Alan Morley (Bristol) 5 caps
 Peter Preece (Coventry) 10 caps
 Keith Smith (Roundhay) 4 caps
 Peter Squires (Harrogate) 12 caps
 Alan Wordsworth (Cambridge University) No caps
 Derek Wyatt (Bedford) No aps

Replacements
 Jeremy Janion (Richmond) 10 Caps
 Alan Old (Middlesbrough) 12 Caps
 Ian Orum (Roundhay) No Caps

Forwards

 Bill Beaumont (Fylde) 1 cap
 Phil Blakeway (Gloucester) No caps
 Mike Burton (Gloucester) 8 caps
 Steve Callum (Upper Clapton) No caps
 Fran Cotton (Coventry) 14 caps
 Neil Mantell (Rosslyn Park) No caps
 Tony Neary (Broughton Park) 26 caps
 John Pullin (Bristol) 39 caps
 Jon Raphael (Northampton) No caps
 Andy Ripley (Rosslyn Park) 19 caps
 Dave Rollitt (Bristol) 9 caps
 Roger Uttley (Gosforth) 11 caps
 Bob Wilkinson (Bedford) No caps

Replacements
 Peter Dixon (Gosforth) 13 caps
 Barry Nelmes (Cardiff) No caps

England tour
England national rugby union team tours of Australia
tour
tour